Mohammad Aslam (born 1 January 1987) is a Pakistani cricketer. He played in fourteen first-class and twelve List A matches between 2005 and 2009. He made his Twenty20 debut on 25 April 2005, for Quetta Bears in the 2004–05 National Twenty20 Cup.

References

External links
 

1987 births
Living people
Pakistani cricketers
Quetta cricketers
Quetta Bears cricketers